Dillon Shane Farrell (born September 7, 1990) is a former American football offensive guard. He played college football at the University of New Mexico and attended Christian Life Academy in Baton Rouge, Louisiana. He has been a member of the San Francisco 49ers, Tennessee Titans and New York Giants of the National Football League (NFL).

Early years
Farrell played high school football at Christian Life Academy. He was chosen as a first-team all-state offensive lineman after his senior year of 2008. In that same year, the Christian Life Academy football team went on to play in the class 1A LHSAA state championship game, finishing as the state runner up. Farrell also played in the U.S. Army Redstick Bowl. He was a four-year starter and named all-district as a junior.

College career
Farrell played for the New Mexico Lobos from 2010 to 2013. He was redshirted in 2009.

Professional career

San Francisco 49ers
Farrell was signed by the San Francisco 49ers on May 12, 2014 after going undrafted in the 2014 NFL Draft. He made his NFL debut on September 21, 2014 against the Arizona Cardinals. He was released by the 49ers on September 5, 2015.

Tennessee Titans
Farrell was signed to the Tennessee Titans' practice squad on September 22, 2015.

New York Giants
Farrell signed a one-year deal with the New York Giants on April 4, 2016. On September 3, 2016, he was released by the Giants.

References

External links

Living people
1990 births
Players of American football from Baton Rouge, Louisiana
American football centers
New Mexico Lobos football players
San Francisco 49ers players
Tennessee Titans players
New York Giants players